Herwig Kircher (born 18 March 1955 in Villach, Austria) is a former Austrian football player. Kircher retired from football in June 1986 after playing for his final club SV Spittal Drau for over two years (January 1984- June 1986).

References

External links

 

1955 births
Living people
Austrian footballers
Austria international footballers
Association football midfielders
LASK players
FC Red Bull Salzburg players
Stade Lavallois players
FC Wacker Innsbruck players
FC Kärnten players
Austrian Football Bundesliga players
Ligue 1 players
Expatriate footballers in France
Austrian expatriate sportspeople in France
Austrian expatriate footballers
Sportspeople from Villach
Footballers from Carinthia (state)